Kurgaon is a village located in Sapotra Tehsil of Karauli district, Rajasthan, India.

References

Villages in Karauli district